

Elimination round

Postseason

UAA
UAA
UAAP Season 68
UAAP volleyball tournaments